Bolwell is a surname. Notable people with the surname include:

 Jan Bolwell (born 1949), New Zealand playwright, choreographer, dancer and teacher of dance 
Jim Bolwell (1911–1993), Australian rules footballer 
 Samantha Bolwell (born 1993), British ice hockey player

See also
 Boswell (surname)